Coppell is a dispersed rural community and unincorporated place in geographic Lowther Township, Cochrane District in Northeastern Ontario, Canada.

The community is located on Ontario Highway 583 and the Algoma Central Railway, in both cases between the communities of Mead to the south and Jogues to the north.

References

Other map sources:

Communities in Cochrane District